Likoma crenata is a moth of the family Sphingidae. It is known from the coast of Somalia, Kenya and Tanzania.

It is very similar to Likoma apicalis, but it is greyer in colour, the apex is less acute and the margin is more regularly crenulated. The transverse bands are much more wavy, the dark areas reduced and contrasting less with the ground colour.

References

Smerinthini
Moths described in 1907
Moths of Africa